FM12 may refer to:

 Football Manager 2012, a video game
 Volvo FM12, a heavy truck
 FM12 NBC Respirator, a gas mask